Beeley is a surname. Notable people with the surname include:

Harold Beeley (1909–2001), British diplomat and historian
John Beeley (1918–1941), English recipient of the Victoria Cross
Shaun Beeley (born 1988), British footballer
Thomas Beeley (1833–1908), founder of Manchester boilermakers Thomas Beeley and Son; (see Fairbairn-Beeley boiler).